The Lost Tapes is a compilation album of studio outtakes and live recordings by the German experimental rock band Can, which was originally released as an LP in 2012 by Spoon Records in conjunction with Mute Records. The compilation was curated by Irmin Schmidt and Daniel Miller, compiled by Irmin Schmidt and Jono Podmore, and edited by Jono Podmore.

When the Can studio in Weilerswist was sold to the German Rock N Pop Museum, they bought everything, including the army mattresses that covered the walls for sound protection, and relocated it to Gronau.
Whilst dismantling the studio, master tapes were found and stored in the Spoon archive. With barely legible labeling, no one was sure what was on these until Irmin Schmidt and long time collaborator Jono Podmore started to go through over 30 hours of music.
They found years of archived material, not outtakes, but rather tracks which had been shelved for a variety of reasons – soundtracks to films that were never released and tracks that didn't make it onto the final versions of albums due to space.
Irmin Schmidt explains "Obviously the tapes weren't really lost, but were left in the cupboards of the studio archives for so long everybody just forgot about them. Everybody except Hildegard [Schmidt, Irmin's wife], who watches over Can and its work like the dragon over the gold of the Nibelungen and doesn't allow forgetting."

The final cut of tracks, dating from 1968 to 1977, features studio material recorded at Schloss Nörvenich and Can Studio, Weilerswist with the Can line-up of Holger Czukay on bass, Michael Karoli on guitars, Jaki Liebezeit on drums and Irmin Schmidt on keyboards, and on most tracks, vocals from Malcolm Mooney or Damo Suzuki.

Track listing

Personnel
Holger Czukay – bass, engineering, editing
Michael Karoli – guitar
Jaki Liebezeit – drums
Irmin Schmidt – keyboards
Malcolm Mooney – vocals
Damo Suzuki – vocals
David Johnson – flute on "Millionenspiel", "Blind Mirror Surf" and "Oscura Primavera"
Rosco Gee – bass on "Barnacles"
Gerd Dudek – saxophone on "Millionenspiel"
Jono Podmore — editing

References 

2012 compilation albums
Can (band) albums
United Artists Records compilation albums